A gatekeeper is a person who controls access to something.

Gatekeeper or gatekeeping may also refer to:
 Gatekeeping (communication), a person or organization who manages or constrains a flow of knowledge
 Gatekeeping (education), controlling the rate at which students progress to more advanced levels of study
 Gatekeeper physician, a primary care physician, with a role of rationing patient access to specialized medicine
 Gatekeeper state, a post-colonial state controlling access to resources

Computing 
 H.323 Gatekeeper, a virtual network switch that manages a H.323 zone
 GNU Gatekeeper, an H.323 gatekeeper implementation
 GateKeeper, an MSN Chat authentication type
 Gatekeeper (macOS), a security feature of Apple's macOS operating system
 GateKeeper (access control device), a device that allows a user to automatically lock and unlock their computer

Science 
 Gatekeeper butterfly (Pyronia tithonus), a European brown butterfly
 A gatekeeper neuron in synaptic gating
 Gatekeeper gene

Popular culture 
 GateKeeper (roller coaster), a roller coaster at Cedar Point
 Gatekeepers (game show), a Singaporean Chinese language game show
 Gate Keepers, an anime series
 Gate Keepers 21, an OVA sequel to the Gate Keepers anime series
 The Gatekeepers, a 2002 book by Jacques Steinberg 
 The Gatekeeper, a 2002 film by John Carlos Frey
 The Gatekeepers (film), a 2012 Israeli documentary film directed by Dror Moreh
 Clare the Gatekeeper, a character in the television series Power Rangers
 GateKeeper software, the fictional security software in The Net
 The Gatekeepers or The Power of Five, a series of books by Anthony Horowitz
 The Gatekeeper, a video board game released in 2004 as the first DVD version of the Atmosfear series

Sports 
 Gatekeeper (boxing), a professional boxer who is considered a test for aspiring boxers 
 The St. Louis GateKeepers, a men's roller derby team based in St. Louis, Missouri

Music 
 The Gatekeeper or Frukwan, a member of the former hip-hop group Gravediggaz
 Gatekeeper (band), an American experimental electronic duo from Chicago
 "Gatekeeper", a song by Within Temptation from the album Enter
 "Gatekeeper", a song by Leslie Feist from her album Let It Die
"Gatekeeper", a song by Jessie Reyez from the album Kiddo

Family law 
 Gatekeeper parent, a parent who controls the relationship between a child and its other parent